The Konar River is a tributary of Damodar River in Hazaribagh and Bokaro districts of the Indian state of Jharkhand.

Course
The Konar originates near Sultana village on the Hazaribagh-Chatra Road. Thereafter, the Konar with its tributary Siwani drains a greater portion of the Hazaribagh plateau, and then descending through the barren wastes of scrub and jungle passes Gomia to receive the waters of the Bokaro River, shortly before it joins the Damodar River near Jaridih Bazar in Bokaro district.

Konar Dam
Konar Dam is the second of the four multi-purpose dams included in the first phase of the Damodar Valley Corporation. It was constructed across the Konar River and inaugurated in 1955.

Bokaro barrage
There is a barrage across the Konar River at the point of its confluence with the Bokaro River to serve Bokaro Thermal Power Station B.

References

Rivers of Jharkhand
Rivers of India